The 1989 National Challenge Cup was the 76th edition of the national soccer championship of the United States. 

The St. Petersburg Kickers (FSSL) won the cup 2–1 against New York Greek American Atlas (HASL) at St. Louis Soccer Park in Fenton, Missouri.

Open Cup Bracket
Home teams listed on top of bracket

Final

Tournament MVP: Joey Valenti

External links
 1989 National Challenge Cup results

Sources
St. Petersburg Times
St. Louis Post-Dispatch
Newsday
The Capital Times
Wisconsin State Journal
Daily Breeze
Chicago Sun-Times
Washington Post
The Dallas Morning News
Los Angeles Times

U.S. Open Cup
Cup